Khanpur Kalan is a village in Gohana tehsil of Sonipat district, in Haryana, India.
B.P.S.M women's university & PGI hospitals are in Khanpur kalan.

Demographics

References

Villages in Sonipat district